Qaleh Now-ye Safiabad (also Romanized as Qal‘eh Now-ye Şafīābād; also known as Bīābān Shīr and Qal‘eh Now-e Şūfīābād) is a village in Soleyman Rural District, Soleyman District, Zaveh County, Razavi Khorasan Province, Iran. At the 2006 census, its population was 1,340, in 311 families.

References 

Populated places in Zaveh County